Kerr's Atlantic tree-rat or Moojen's Atlantic tree rat (Phyllomys kerri), is a spiny rat species found in Brazil.

References

Phyllomys
Mammals described in 1950